Edward Andrew Yoon Beom Shin (born July 17, 1976) is an American actor. He played Dave Mendoza in the Netflix series Alexa & Katie, and portrays characters named Agent Mike Li in the 2015 first season of the Marvel Cinematic Universe (MCU) television series Agent Carter and the 2018 feature film Peppermint.

Biography
Shin graduated from the University of Chicago. He played Stanley Mao in ER. and Henry Cho in Gilmore Girls. His guest television appearances include NYPD Blue, Malcolm in the Middle, NCIS, Two and a Half Men, 2 Broke Girls, Castle, The Middle and The Big Bang Theory. He voiced Taka in Ghost of Tsushima.

Filmography

Film

Television

Video games

References

External links
 

1976 births
Living people
Male actors from Chicago
Williams College alumni
University of Chicago alumni
American male actors of Korean descent
American male television actors
American male film actors
American male voice actors
21st-century American male actors